Shocking Blue was a Dutch rock band formed in 1967 in The Hague. It was part of the music movement in the Netherlands that was generally known by the name Nederbeat. The band had a number of hits throughout the counterculture movement during the 1960s and early 1970s, including "Send Me a Postcard" and "Venus", which became their biggest hit and reached number one on the U.S. Billboard Hot 100 and many other countries during 1969 and 1970. The band sold 13.5 million records by 1973 but disbanded in 1974. Together with Golden Earring they are considered the most successful Nederbeat-band, if the criterion is scoring hits abroad and especially in the United States.

History

Original era
Shocking Blue were founded in 1967 by The Motions guitarist Robbie van Leeuwen. Other members of the group at this time were Fred de Wilde, Klaasje van der Wal (1 February 1949 – 12 February 2018) and Cor van der Beek (9 June 1949 – 2 April 1998). They had a minor hit in 1968 with "Lucy Brown is Back in Town". When De Wilde was the band's lead singer, the band originally had a sound that was described as cross between The Beatles and Brothers Four. 

De Wilde left in 1968 after joining the Dutch army, and van Leeuwen was introduced to Mariska Veres, singing at that time with a club band. He persuaded her to take over the vocals, and the group recorded a worldwide hit with the song "Venus", which had entered the Veronica top 40 hit parade at position #12 the 12 July 1969 and had peaked at number three on 26 July 1969 in the Netherlands. The song was released in the United States and the United Kingdom at the end of the year and reached number one on the Billboard Hot 100 in February 1970. It subsequently sold 350,000 copies in Germany and topped the U.S. chart for three weeks, the first song from the Netherlands to do so. It sold over one million copies there by January 1970 and received a gold record awarded by the Recording Industry Association of America. Global sales exceeded five million copies. Other hits include "Send Me a Postcard" in late 1968 and "Long and Lonesome Road" (often mistakenly named as "Long Lonesome Road") in 1969.

"Venus" was followed by "Mighty Joe" (flip-side "Wild Wind") in 1969 and "Never Marry a Railroad Man" (flip-side "Roll Engine Roll") in 1970, both of which sold over a million records. The latter became a top-ten hit in several countries around the world. Later songs were successful in Europe, Latin America, and Asia, including "Hello Darkness", "Demon Lover" (1970), "Shocking You", "Blossom Lady" and "Out of Sight, Out of Mind" (1971), "Inkpot", "Rock in the Sea" and "Eve and the Apple" (1972) and "Oh Lord" (1973), but they failed to make the charts in the U.S. or U.K.

Klaasje van der Wal left towards the end of 1971, following their first trip to Japan (which spawned a live album). In 1974, Robbie Van Leeuwen quit, and Mariska Veres left later that year, leading to the band's split. Veres went on to pursue a solo career until 1982.

Reunions
Shocking Blue reformed with its most famous line-up in 1979 and recorded "Louise" as their first single since their break-up in 1974. The song was never released. They did, however, perform live in 1980 with earlier songs such as "Venus" and "Never Marry a Railroad Man". 

The band attempted another comeback in 1984 and released a new single "The Jury and the Judge" with "I Am Hanging on to Love" as the B-side in 1986. 

In 1994 the single "Body and Soul" was released.

Aftermath
Drummer Cor van der Beek died on 2 April 1998 at age 49 in Rotterdam, Netherlands. Mariska Veres died of gallbladder cancer on 2 December 2006 at age 59 in The Hague, Netherlands. Bassist Klaasje van der Wal died on 12 February 2018 at age 69.

Cover versions
 Bananarama covered "Venus" in 1986, hitting number one in the United States, Canada, and Australia, and reaching the UK top 10 (#8). 
 Nirvana covered the song "Love Buzz" as their debut single in 1988; it also appeared on their 1989 album Bleach.
 The Prodigy covered the song "Love Buzz" on their 2004 album Always Outnumbered, Never Outgunned, retitling the song "Phoenix".
 Amy Gore & Her Valentines covered "Send Me a Postcard" in 2012 on the album In Love.
 Mint Royale remixed Shocking Blue's version of "Acka Raga" (Acka Ragh)(itself a cover from John Mayer and Joe Harriott's Indo-jazz fusions song of the same title) for their 1999 track "From Rusholme with Love", featured in several films of the time.
 Jess and the Ancient Ones covered "Long and Lonesome Road" on their 2013 EP Astral Sabbat.
 The Mr. T Experience covered "Send Me a Postcard" on their 1990 album Making Things with Light.
 Big Business covered "Send Me a Postcard" as a bonus track on their 2009 album Mind the Drift.
 Chantal Janzen, Jan Smit and Edsilia Rombley covered a remixed of "Venus" by DJ Pieter Gabriel for the flag parade introducing the 26 finalist countries of Eurovision Song Contest 2021.
Bob Mould covered "Send Me a Postcard" on the 2019 album Sunshine Rock.
The DT's covered "Send Me a Postcard" and Hello Darkness on the 2020 limited edition Vinyl 7" from Get Hip Recordings - GH-269

Members
Former members
Robbie van Leeuwen (guitar, sitar and backing vocals, 1967–1973)
Fred de Wilde (vocals, 1967–1968)
Klaasje van der Wal (bass guitar, 1967–1971; died 2018)
Cor van der Beek (drums, 1967–1974; died 1998)
Mariska Veres (vocals, 1968–1974; died 2006)
Leo van de Ketterij (guitar, 1970–1971; died 2021)
Martin van Wijk (guitar, 1973–1974)
 (bass guitar, 1972–1974)
Wim Voermans (bass guitar, 1984-1986)
 (drums, 1985-1986)
Michael Eschauzier (keyboards, 1993-2006)
 (guitar, vocals, 1987-2006)
Charles Pesch
 Gerben de Bruijn (drums, 1993-1998)
 Michel Schreuder (drums, vocals, 1998-2006)

Timeline

Discography

Albums

Studio albums
Shocking Blue (also known as Beat with Us, German version) (1967)
At Home (also known as The Shocking Blue, 1970 American version) (1969)
Scorpio's Dance (also known as Sally Was a Good Old Girl, Japanese title) (1970)
Third Album (also known as Shocking You) (1971)
Inkpot (1972)
Attila (also known as Rock in the Sea, Japanese title, and Eve and the Apple) (1972)
Ham (1973)
Dream on Dreamer (1974)
Good Times (1974)

Live albums
Live in Japan (1972)

Compilation albums
Charted or certified compilation albums

Other compilation albums
1969 Sensational Shocking Blue (Discofoon)
1970 Shocking Blue (Pink Elephant)
1971 Hello Darkness (Pink Elephant)
1972 The Shocking Blue, Perfect Collection (Polydor)
1972 The Best of Shocking Blue (Pink Elephant)
1973 Shocking Blue's Best (Metronome)
1973 With Love from... Shocking Blue (Capri)
1978 The Shocking Blue Double Deluxe (Polydor)
1980 Venus (Piccadilly)
1981 The Shocking Blue Greatest Hits (CNR)
1986 Best of Shocking Blue (CNR)
1986 Classics (21 Records)
1986 The Best of Shocking Blue (Victor)
1990 The Very Best of Shocking Blue (Red Bullet), (Arcade, 1993)
1990 Shocking Blue 20 Greatest Hits (Repertoire)
1990 Venus (Castle Communications AG)
1994 A Portrait of Shocking Blue (Castle)
1995 Shocking Blue The Golden Hits (Red Bullet)
1997 Singles A's and B's (Repertoire)
1997 Shocking Blue Grand Collection (A.R.O.)
1998 Shocking You (Laserlight)
2000 Shocking Blue Golden Collection 2000 (Lighthouse)
2000 All Gold of the World Shocking Blue (Mekkophone & Castle Communications)
2004 Shocking Blue Greatest Hits (Red Bullet)
2022 At Home (The Singles) (Music on Vinyl; RSD limited edition 10" pink vinyl)

Box sets

Singles

Videos
2004 Greatest Hits Around the World (Red Bullet)

See also
 List of one-hit wonders in the United States

References

External links

 
 
 Shocking Blue biography
 Shocking Blue discography
 

Dutch psychedelic rock music groups
Nederpop
Musical groups established in 1967
Musical groups disestablished in 1974
1967 establishments in the Netherlands
1974 disestablishments in the Netherlands
Female-fronted musical groups